The Education Journal is a bi-annual, peer-reviewed academic journal focused on the field of education. The journal was established in 1968 and is published by the Hong Kong Institute of Educational Research at the Chinese University of Hong Kong. Articles in the journal are published in either Chinese or English. In 2010, the journal merged with the Journal of Basic Education. After 2018, the journal discontinued its print version, and all subsequent volumes were published online only.

See also
 List of education journals
 Educational psychology

External links
 Official page

References

Education journals
English-language journals
Biannual journals